General Nakar, officially the Municipality of General Nakar (Ilocano: Ili ti Heneral Nakar),  is a 1st class municipality in the province of Quezon, Philippines. According to the 2020 census, it has a population of 34,225 people. It is the largest municipality in the province of Quezon in terms of land area, occupying . It is accessible by land from Metro Manila, passing through Marcos Highway (Marikina-Infanta Highway).

It was named after Major General Guillermo Peñamante Nakar (1905–1942), the martyred leader of the 1st Battalion of the 71st Infantry Division of the USAFFE against the attacking Japanese Forces and a native of barangay Anoling.

History 
In the late 1940s, the locals, headed by forester Fortunato Avellano, initiated a petition to create the municipality. It came into fruition with the help of Quezon's 1st district Representative Fortunato Suarez and Quezon Governor Gregorio Santayana.

On July 21, 1949, the barrios of Anoling, Banglos, Batangan, Magsikap, Maligaya, Minahan, Katablingan and Pamplona, then part of the municipality of Infanta, were separated and constituted into a new and separate municipality known as General Nakar, by virtue of Executive Order No. 246 signed by President Elpidio Quirino.

Geography

Barangays

General Nakar is composed of 19 barangays.

Climate

Demographics

Economy

References

External links 

 General Nakar Profile at PhilAtlas.com
 [ Philippine Standard Geographic Code]
 Philippine Census Information
 Local Governance Performance Management System 

Municipalities of Quezon
Establishments by Philippine executive order